Lee Seul-Gi  (born 24 September 1986) is a South Korean football midfielder, who currently plays for FC Anyang in K League Challenge.

Club career 

Lee Seul-Gi joined Daegu FC from Dongguk University in 2009, being part of the draft that year. On 8 March 2009, Lee made his Daegu FC first-team debut in a match against Seongnam Ilhwa Chunma. On 22 March 2009, Lee scored his first goal against Pohang Steelers. He scored his 2nd goal in the 1–2 loss to Incheon United at the Incheon Munhak Stadium on 2 May. Lee scored a further goal in an away match against Ulsan Hyundai Horang-i in a 1–3 loss on 12 July.  Lee continued to play a major role for the club during the 2010 season, but only found the net once in 23 games.

On 29 November 2010, he moved to Pohang Steelers in a swap deal, with Song Chang-Ho moving to Daegu.

In November 2011, he was traded to Daejeon Citizen FC along with Kim Dong-Hee for veteran forward Park Sung-Ho.

Club career statistics

External links 
 

1986 births
Living people
Association football midfielders
South Korean footballers
Daegu FC players
Pohang Steelers players
Daejeon Hana Citizen FC players
Hwaseong FC players
Incheon United FC players
FC Anyang players
K League 1 players
K League 2 players
K3 League players